Caledonia County is a county located in the northeastern part of the U.S. state of Vermont. As of the 2020 census, the population was 30,233. Its shire town (county seat) is the town of St. Johnsbury. The county was created in 1792 and organized in 1796. It was given the Latin name for Scotland, in honor of the many settlers who claimed ancestry there.

History
The county shares the same pre-Columbian history with the Northeast Kingdom.

Rogers' Rangers were forced to retreat through the county following their attack on Saint-Francis, Quebec in 1759. To confound their avenging pursuers, they had split up. One group came south over the summit into the Passumpsic River Valley.

Vermont was divided into two counties in March 1778.  In 1781 the legislature divided the northernmost county, Cumberland, into three counties: Windham and Windsor, located about where they are now. The northern remainder was called Orange county. This latter tract nearly corresponded with the old New York county of Gloucester, organized by that province March 16, 1770, with Newbury as the shire town.

On November 5, 1792, the legislature divided Chittenden and Orange counties into six separate counties, as follows: Chittenden, Orange, Franklin, Caledonia, Essex, and Orleans.  There is a supposition that the county was called Caledonia, to commemorate the large number of Scottish settlers.

Caledonians joined the Union Army in response to a call for volunteers. In September 1861, they joined the Vermont 6th Vermont Infantry, and helped fill out Companies B, D and E. The regiment ultimately became part of the First Vermont Brigade.

In 2008, the county was declared a federal disaster area as the result of storms and flooding which occurred on July 18.

Geography

Caledonia is the most populated county of the three in the Northeast Kingdom. However, it is the smallest in area of the three.

The county has a number of brooks and rivers. The Connecticut River runs along the southeast and forms one of the eastern boundaries of the county. The northern towns are drained by the head branches of the Passumpsic River, which is the largest in the county. It flows south and empties into the Connecticut River in Barnet. There are the Wells, Stevens and Joe's Rivers in the south. In the west the head waters of the Winooski and Lamoille Rivers. There are about twenty lakes and ponds in the county. The largest are Harvey's Lake, in Barnet; Wells River and Lund's Ponds, in Groton; Cole's Pond, in Walden; Clark's and Center Ponds, in Newark; and Stile's Pond, in Waterford. There are falls at different places on the Connecticut, Passumpsic, Wells and Joe's Rivers. Some of the water power has been harnessed for electricity.

There are sulphur springs in Wheelock, Haynesville, in Hardwick; and in St. Johnsbury, near the Moose River.

Geology
Calciferous mica schist underlies much of the county. There is argillaceous slate running through Waterford and Kirby, which narrows in Burke.

Waterford had a lot of talc. This belongs to the gold bearing formations. Specimens of gold were found in town, and iron and copper pyrites in veins. But none in commercial quality. In Waterford there was an outcrop of slate that was quarried for roofing. Kirby Mountain, in Kirby, was largely granite of commercial quality.

Ryegate had  granite on the south and west sides of Blue Mountain. The granite was created by volcanic action. This was a medium colored granite of commercial grain and texture. It was quarried in the 19th century.

Perhaps the most widely known monument locally using this granite was the soldiers monument at Peacham, Vermont. Monuments from this granite exist all over the country. This was one of the best quality quarries in the country in the 19th century.

The presence of Kame terraces in the country are of interest in connection with the drift that gave the Northeast Kingdom its soil, and its surface stones and boulders. These terraces have beds of sand and clay from which bricks were once manufactured.

Based on research by Edward Hitchcock two or three basins can be identified based on a larger number of interconnected terraces in the Passumpsic River Valley.

The first extends from the mouth of the Passumpsic River in Barnet, to the northwest corner of the town of Waterford, on the railroad. The river runs through a narrow valley in Barnet, a gorge with no terraces. Narrow terraces in the Town of Passumpsic expand and form a basin. The fourth terrace on the west side of the river is part of the next basin, which is in St. Johnsbury and Lyndon. St. Johnsbury Village is on this high terrace which is called "St. Johnsbury Plain". The base of the terraces at St. Johnsbury is composed of clay. The same terrace occurs on both sides of the river valley beyond Lyndon. There are lower terraces at intervals.

Lyndonville has a high terrace. This may have once extended across the valley to form the end of a basin. Its lower strata are clayey, and are folded and curved. West of this terrace the level is lower. There is the course of a former river bed which ran towards the east. There is a lot of sand and fine gravel adjoining.

Every stream from either side of the valley has its large terraces to correspond with those of the Passumpsic River. It is a characteristic of these terraces that they are large while their quantity is small. The count never exceeds five which is unusual.

The third basin includes the east branch of the Passumpsic River which runs through the Town of Burke. In East Burke there are several terraces. Near the village there are four on the west side, and two on the east side. Above East Burke the valley rises so that its bottom appears like a terrace. Its steep slope crosses the valley at right angles. There are indistinct terraces on its sides. Since the valley  seems to be too wide to correspond with the size of the river, the valley may have been formed by water from unknown sources in prehistoric times.

Caledonia has more muck deposits than any other county in the state. This was once thought to be profitable for farmers.

Adjacent counties
 Orleans County - north
 Essex County - northeast
 Grafton County, New Hampshire - southeast
 Washington County - southwest
 Orange County - south
 Lamoille County - west

Demographics

2010 census
As of the 2010 United States Census, there were 31,227 people, 12,553 households, and 8,153 families residing in the county. Of the 12,553 households, 29.4% had children under the age of 18 living with them, 49.7% were married couples living together, 10.1% had a female householder with no husband present, 35.1% were non-families, and 27.5% of all households were made up of individuals. The average household size was 2.38 and the average family size was 2.86. The median age was 42.1 years.

The median income for a household in the county was $42,706 and the median income for a family was $51,503. Males had a median income of $40,223 versus $30,707 for females. The per capita income for the county was $22,504. About 9.6% of families and 13.5% of the population were below the poverty line, including 15.6% of those under age 18 and 13.0% of those age 65 or over.

Government
As in all Vermont counties, there is a small executive function which is mostly consolidated at the state level. Remaining county government is judicial. There are no "county taxes."

In 2007, median property taxes in the county were $2,278, placing it 265 out of 1,817 counties in the nation with populations over 20,000.

The elected officials of the county as of the 2018 elections are as follows:

Elections
In 1828, Caledonia County voted for National Republican Party candidate John Quincy Adams.

In 1832, the county was won by Anti-Masonic Party candidate William Wirt.

From William Henry Harrison in 1836 to Winfield Scott in 1852, the county would vote the Whig Party candidates.

From John C. Frémont in 1856 to Richard Nixon in 1960 (barring 1912, where the county was won by Progressive Party candidate and former president Theodore Roosevelt), the Republican Party would have a 104-year winning streak in the county.

In 1964, the county was won by Democratic Party incumbent President Lyndon B. Johnson, who became not only the first Democratic presidential candidate to win the county, but to win the state of Vermont entirely.

Following the Democrats victory in 1964, the county went back to voting for Republican candidates for another 20 year winning streak starting with Richard Nixon in 1968 and ending with George H. W. Bush in 1988.

The county would be won by Bill Clinton in both the 1992 and 1996 presidential elections.

George W. Bush would win the county in 2000 and would be the last time a Republican presidential candidate would carry the county.

John Kerry won the county in 2004 and it has been won by Democratic candidates ever since.

|}

Transportation

Airport
The Caledonia County Airport is located in Lyndon, Vermont.

Major highways
  Interstate 91
  Interstate 93
  U.S. Route 2
  U.S. Route 5
  U.S. Route 302

Communities

Towns

 Barnet
 Burke
 Danville
 Groton
 Hardwick
 Kirby
 Lyndon
 Newark
 Peacham
 Ryegate
 Sheffield
 St. Johnsbury (shire town)
 Stannard
 Sutton
 Walden
 Waterford
 Wheelock

Villages
Incorporated villages are census divisions and provide additional services. They remain part of the towns they are in. Cities are formed when villages become large enough to warrant greater governmental organization, and become separate from the surrounding town.

 Burke Hollow - unincorporated village of Burke
 East Hardwick - unincorporated village of Hardwick
 East Lyndon - unincorporated village of Lyndon
 East Ryegate - unincorporated village of Ryegate
 East St. Johnsbury - unincorporated village of St. Johnsbury
 Lower Waterford - unincorporated village of Waterford
 Lyndon Corner - unincorporated village of Lyndon; corresponds to the Lyndon census-designated place
 Lyndonville - incorporated village of Lyndon
 Mackville - unincorporated village of Hardwick
 McIndoe Falls - unincorporated village of Barnet
 Passumpsic - unincorporated village of Barnet
 Ryegate Corner - unincorporated village of Ryegate
 South Kirby - unincorporated village of Kirby
 South Ryegate - unincorporated village of Ryegate
 St. Johnsbury Center - unincorporated village of St. Johnsbury
 Upper Waterford - unincorporated village of Waterford
 West Burke - incorporated village of Burke

Census-designated places

 Barnet
 Danville
 East Burke
 Groton
 Hardwick
 Lyndon
 Lyndon Center
 Peacham
 Sheffield
 St. Johnsbury
 Sutton

Notable people
 Anne Morrow Lindbergh died in Passumpsic in 2001.

See also
 Historical U.S. Census totals for Caledonia County, Vermont
 National Register of Historic Places listings in Caledonia County, Vermont

References

External links
 National Register of Historic Places listing for Caledonia Co., Vermont

 
Northeast Kingdom, Vermont
1796 establishments in Vermont
Populated places established in 1796